Rockhampton is a city in the Rockhampton Region of Central Queensland, Australia. The population of Rockhampton in June 2021 was 79,967, making it the fourth-largest city in the state outside of the cities of South East Queensland, and the 22nd-largest city in Australia. Today, Rockhampton is an industrial and agricultural centre of the north.

Rockhampton is one of the oldest cities in Queensland and in Northern Australia. In 1853, Charles and William Archer came across the Toonooba river, which is now also known as the Fitzroy River, which they claimed in honour of Sir Charles FitzRoy. The Archer brothers took up a run near Gracemere in 1855, and more settlers arrived soon after, enticed by the fertile valleys. The town of Rockhampton was proclaimed in 1858, and surveyed by William Henry Standish, Arthur F Wood and Francis Clarke, the chosen street design closely resembled the Hoddle Grid in Melbourne and consisted of a grid of wide boulevards and laneways, which was uncommon in Queensland. Within the year, gold was found at Canoona, and led to the first North Australian gold rush. The Canoona gold rush led to an influx of migrants who quickly transformed Rockhampton into the second-largest port in the state; during this period, Rockhampton was nicknamed as the "City of the Three S's", of which were "Sin, Sweat, and Sorrow". Subsequent gold rushes at Mount Morgan Mine, which was at the time one of the most productive gold mines in the world, laid the foundations for much of the city's Victorian architecture.

The city is noted for its Queenslander architecture, especially in the areas of Allenstown and the Range. Rockhampton is also a large tourist destination known for its history and culture supporting such institutions as the Rockhampton Art Gallery, one of the most extensive regional galleries in Australia, the Central Queensland University with campuses across five states, the Rockhampton Heritage Village, and Dreamtime Cultural Centre. It is also famous as the hometown of Rod Laver – one of the best tennis players in history. The city is served by the Rockhampton Airport and acts as a gateway to local tourist locations such as the Capricorn Caves and Mount Archer National Park, as well as regional tourist areas including the historic town of Mount Morgan, Yeppoon and the Capricorn Coast, alongside the island chains offshore that include Great Keppel Island.

History

Indigenous Australians 
The Capricorn district is the traditional home of the Darumbal Aboriginal people. The Darumbal (Tarumbul, Tharoombool) language region includes the city of Rockhampton extending south towards Raglan Creek and north towards the Styx River and inland along the Broad Sound Ranges. The Gangulu (Kangulu, Kanolu, Kaangooloo, Khangulu) language region includes the towns of Clermont and Springsure extending south towards the Dawson River, and includes parts of Rockhampton and South Rockhampton.

British colonisation 
The British colonisation of the area began in 1853, when the Archer brothers, Charles and William, who were seeking grazing lands arrived in the Rockhampton area. They were acting on information from earlier expeditions by Ludwig Leichhardt and Thomas Mitchell, who had explored the area in 1844 and 1846 and noted suitable land for grazing then.

In January 1854, the New South Wales government proclaimed two new districts: Port Curtis and Leichhardt (roughly today's Fitzroy Region), and the Archer brothers returned in August 1855 to set up their pastoral run at Gracemere. The Fitzroy River provided a convenient waterway for shipping of supplies and produce, and the Archer brothers constructed a wool shed just downstream of a bar of rocks that prevented further upstream navigation from the coast. These rocks were incorporated with the traditional English term for a village, and the name "Rockhampton" was first coined by Charles Archer and the local Commissioner from Crown Lands, William Wiseman.

In 1855, Scottish colonists and brothers William Thomas Elliott and George Mackenzie Elliot arrived at Gracemere and soon after, took up landholdings at Canoona, north of present-day Yaamba. Their father was James Elliot, 3rd Laird of Wolfelee House near Hawick in Scotland. One of their other brothers was Walter Elliot of the East India Company and secretary to the governor of the Madras Presidency.

In January 1856, after a massacre of local Aboriginal people perpetrated by Lieutenant John Murray of the Native Police at nearby Nankin Creek, some 200 Aboriginal men, women and children came to Canoona and began shouting at the employees of the Elliots. William Thomas Elliot and his men opened fire at random upon the group which fled after a short time. William and an employee were wounded (the employee reportedly died) and about seven of the local inhabitants were killed. Fellow colonist, Charles Archer of Gracemere and a group of Native Police troopers later pursued these Aboriginal people toward the east and punished them further. Local Aboriginal people friendly to Archer were also fired upon, killing one.

Permanent British settlement at the Rockhampton township began in July 1856, when Richard Palmer travelled from Gladstone with an escort of Native Police under sub-Lieutenant Walter Powell to set up a store. Powell arrived at the site first and constructed the Native Police barracks. This was the first habitable British building established at Rockhampton and it was located on the south bank of the Fitzroy River at the end of Albert Street.

With abundant grazing lands and waters from the Fitzroy River and its many tributaries and lagoons, the region continued to expand rapidly. In 1858, the town of Rockhampton was officially proclaimed. The town was surveyed at this time and the first sales of building allotments were held that year. In 1859, gold was discovered at Canoona. Miners rushed to the new field, using the site of Rockhampton on the Fitzroy River as the nearest navigable port. The Canoona field proved to be very disappointing and thousands of would-be gold seekers were left stranded at Rockhampton. Although many returned south, others stayed, adding to the new town's population.

Conflict with Aboriginal people in the region continued and further massacres occurred. In 1859, John Arthur Macartney attempted to stock his cousin's Belmont property just to the north of Rockhampton when a shepherd was killed by local Aboriginal men. 2nd Lieutenant Frederick Carr of the Native Police together with his troopers, the Macartneys, Peter Fitzallan MacDonald and Henry Brisdon, formed an armed group which set out to track down those responsible. The group followed the tracks and "dispersed" them. One account of this incident describes how around hundred of the tribe were rounded up and "it ended in the usual way and the bulk of the wild mob were shot."

By 1861, the town boasted a regular newspaper, banks, court house, and school of arts. Direct shipments of imported goods and migrants from the United Kingdom began to be received during the 1860s. In 1862, land in the Kensington Estate, described as just three miles from "the most rapidly rising town and district in the whole of the colonies" was advertised for sale. During the 1860s and '70s, Rockhampton developed as the main port for the developing Central Queensland hinterland, the main export at that time being wool.

A Primitive Methodist Church opened in Fitzroy Street, Rockhampton, in January 1864.

Gold rushes and expansion 
In the 1880s and '90s, sea ports were established on the coast, adjacent to the mouth of the Fitzroy River. Broadmount was on the northern side and Port Alma on the south. Railways were subsequently constructed to carry goods to the wharves at these locations, with the railway to Broadmount opening on 1 January 1898 and the line to Port Alma opening on 16 October 1911. Maintenance on the Broadmount line ceased in August 1929. The following month, the wharf caught fire and the line was effectively closed in July 1930. The line to Port Alma closed on 15 October 1986.

The significant gold deposit at Mount Morgan to the southwest was discovered in the 1880s, and Rockhampton became the main port through which the wealth of Mount Morgan gold was channelled. Due to the wealth of Mount Morgan, Rockhampton weathered the severe economic depression of the 1890s, and many of the town's substantial brick and stone public buildings date from this period. The historic streetscape of Quay Street still displays a number of substantial historic buildings, built when Rockhampton was envisaged as being capital of a state of North Queensland. Most prominent of these is the sandstone Customs House (1900), which today houses an information centre. Other important 19th-century buildings include the Post Office (1892), the Supreme Court House (1888), and St Joseph's Cathedral (1892).

In September 1892 the Anglican Church in Rockhampton was the first new building in Rockhampton to be lit by electricity from the new gasworks. It was also the first church in Australia to be lit with electricity.

Central Queensland Separation Movement 
In 1889 the people of Rockhampton established the Central Queensland Territorial Separation League, a secessionist movement with the intentions of breaking away from the state of Queensland. The core argument of movement was that the seat of government, Brisbane was in the south-east corner of the State. It was so far removed from substantial portions of the state that these areas and their citizens were left disadvantaged and neglected as political and economic interests focused on the south. Supplementing the Central Queensland Territorial Separation League, the women of Rockhampton established their own separation league in October 1892. The inaugural meeting of the Women’s Central Queensland Territorial Separation League was held at the Rockhampton School of Arts and attended by 200 women. Their main focus was preparing a petition to Queen Victoria.  The introductory text set out their grievances and described the immense size of Queensland: being twelve times the area of England and Wales, and larger than France, Germany, Spain and Portugal combined. The State Library of Queensland holds the original petition, signed by over 3000 women who were in support of Central Queensland becoming a separate state. The petition was forwarded to Queen Victoria but was dismissed by the Premier of Queensland, Sir Samuel Walker Griffith.

20th century 
The City of Rockhampton was proclaimed in 1902. The rail connection south to Brisbane was completed in 1903, but it was not until 1921 that the northern connection to Mackay was finally completed. This further strengthened Rockhampton's role as the port for the whole of Central Queensland.

A passenger tramway began operating on 16 June 1909, making Rockhampton the only provincial city in Queensland to have a street tramway. Purrey steam trams ran on a number of routes throughout South Rockhampton, totalling  of track. The discomfort of passengers riding in steam trams in a tropical climate in part led to their demise in 1939, replaced by a bus network run by the City Council.

Strong shaking was felt in Rockhampton when the "Great Queensland Earthquake of 1918" occurred on 7 June 1918. The earthquake was felt from Mackay in the north, to Grafton in New South Wales, and west to Charleville. Estimated to have reached a 6.0 magnitude, the earthquake caused some damage to buildings including chimney stacks crumbling, plaster being dislodged from walls and ceilings, water tanks bursting and trees being uprooted.  Houses and buildings experienced considerable swaying with crockery smashing on the floor and pictures falling off walls. The 1918 earthquake remains as the largest to have ever hit Queensland since European settlement.

Restaurant proprietors, Emanuel, William and Nicholas Economos, trading as the Economos Bros., ran their business in East Street, Rockhampton. East Street was a bustling metropolis when the brothers opened their traditional Greek café in the 1920s. Previously known as the Australian Café, the brothers renamed it the Busy Bee Café.

During the Second World War, a US army base was established outside the city; it hosted up to 70,000 servicemen en route to action in the Pacific and New Guinea.

On 2 March 1949, Rockhampton was severely damaged by a cyclone.

The Fitzroy River Barrage was commissioned in 1971. The barrage was funded by the Rockhampton City Council to provide a reliable source of water to the city, and to effectively drought proof Rockhampton. In 2002, a study showed that salinity was increasing in the Fitzroy Basin and, while only small areas of land were severely affected by salinity, urged that steps be taken to manage salinity by good irrigation practices and better management of tree clearing.

In 1989, two bombs exploded inside the Shark Nightclub, causing injuries and extensive damage to the building. The following year, the Factory Nightclub was also damaged by a bomb. It is not known who planted the bombs.

21st century
In 2003, Rockhampton was the centre of significant national media interest after local teenager Natasha Ryan was found in the North Rockhampton home of her boyfriend, Scott Black, after being missing for five years. Serial killer Leonard Fraser had been charged with her murder, as her disappearance occurred in the period in which Fraser had abducted and murdered other women and girls. An anonymous tip-off during Fraser's trial led to the discovery of Ryan. Despite Ryan's discovery, Fraser's defence did not seek a mistrial and Fraser was convicted of the murders of other women and girls and was given an indefinite life sentence.

On 20 February 2015, Rockhampton was severely damaged by Cyclone Marcia damaging hundreds of homes and businesses with wind speeds over 150 km/h recorded in Rockhampton. Major flooding was experienced in the upper reaches of the Fitzroy River after more than 250mm were recorded. The cyclone left about 100,000 properties across Central Queensland without power.

Aboriginal and Torres Strait Islander people made up 7.2% of the population. 82.8% of people were born in Australia. The next most common countries of birth were New Zealand 1.4%, England 1.3%, Philippines 1.1%, India 0.6% and Vietnam 0.4%. 86.4% of people spoke only English at home. Other languages spoken at home included Vietnamese 0.5%, Tagalog 0.5%, Portuguese 0.3%, Filipino 0.3% and Mandarin 0.3% The most common responses for religion were Catholic 26.5%, No Religion 22.6% and Anglican 17.1%.

Geography 

Rockhampton has a north and south side with three bridges connecting the two sides, one for trains and two for vehicles and people.

Rockhampton lies just north of the Tropic of Capricorn in Central Queensland. A sculpture originally marking the latitude was later moved into town to be more accessible to tourists.

The Berserker Range lies on the eastern side of the city, with the Athelstane Range to the west. The coastal area to the east of the city is known as the Capricorn Coast, with the rapidly growing town of Yeppoon its major centre.

Climate 

Rockhampton experiences a hot-summer humid subtropical climate with mild winters (Köppen: Cfa/Cwa/BSh, Trewartha: BSal/BShl/Cfal/Cfhl). The city is situated on the Tropic of Capricorn and lies within the southeast trade wind belt, too far south to experience regular north west monsoonal influence, and too far north to gain much influence from cold fronts sweeping in from the Southern Ocean. The city receives 125.0 days of clear skies annually.	

Rockhampton lies within the cyclone risk zone and has experienced several large cyclones since European settlement.

The Rockhampton area is also subject to summer thunderstorms. There is a high incidence of winter and early spring fogs. Maximum temperatures in the low to mid teens have been recorded in October to March.

The Fitzroy River at Rockhampton has a long and well documented history of flooding with flood records dating back to 1859. The highest recorded flood occurred in January 1918 and reached  on the Rockhampton gauge. The second highest flood in Rockhampton was recorded on 19 February 1954, when the Fitzroy River peaked at a height of 9.4 metres. Rockhampton's third worst flood was recorded on 12 January 1991, when the Fitzroy River peaked at 9.3 metres.

More recently, Rockhampton was affected by the 2010–2011 Queensland floods when the Fitzroy River peaked at 9.2 metres on 5 January 2011, although the river had been expected to rise as high as 9.4 metres.

Heritage listings 

Rockhampton has a number of heritage-listed sites. For details see the List of heritage listed buildings in Rockhampton.

Governance 

Rockhampton is governed by the Rockhampton Regional Council. The Council consists of a mayor and seven councillors. The Mayor is elected by the public, and the Councillors are elected from seven single-member divisions using an optional preferential voting system. Elections are held every four years.

Tony Williams is the current mayor after the 2021 mayoral by-election following the resignation of long time mayor Margaret Strelow. Margaret Strelow won the mayoral elections in 2013, 2016 and March 2020. Strelow had also served as Mayor of the former City of Rockhampton from 2000 to 2008.

The present Rockhampton Regional Council area was formed as a result of the 2008 amalgamation of four local government areas. These were the original City of Rockhampton which comprised most of the Rockhampton metropolitan area, the Shire of Fitzroy comprising Gracemere and surrounding districts, and the Shire of Mount Morgan around the town of Mount Morgan itself.

The fourth local government area was the Shire of Livingstone which comprised the adjacent coastal towns and hinterland to the east and north of Rockhampton as well as some outlying Rockhampton suburbs. However, Livingstone Shire de-amalgamated from Rockhampton Region in 2014 following a referendum.

Before the 2008 amalgamation, the City of Rockhampton had a population of approximately 74,530, Fitzroy Shire approximately 11,357, and Mount Morgan Shire approximately 2,925 people.

Proposed boundary changes between Rockhampton Regional Council and Livingstone Shire Council are under review by the Local Government Change Commission. The changes relate to three suburbs contiguous with Rockhampton City which are presently part of Livingstone Shire. The proposed changes will affect 1170 properties in the suburbs of Glenlee, Rockyview, and Glendale.

Economy

Agriculture

The agricultural sector, specifically the cattle trade, is a dominant industry in Central Queensland.  The latter has been visually represented around Rockhampton City with a 
set of seven large statues of bulls known as the 'Big Bulls'.

Two large abattoirs are located on the south-eastern outskirts of Rockhampton provides employment for people living in Rockhampton and also for refugees from overseas who are recruited when the companies experience difficulty finding local workers to fill vacancies.

One meat processing plant is located at Lakes Creek, operated by Teys Australia (a Cargill joint venture) while the JBS meatworks is located at Nerimbera.

The Teys Australia meatworks at Lakes Creek was previously owned by Kerry Packer's Consolidated Meat Group. CMG temporarily closed the facility in 2002. It was reopened in 2004, when Consolidated Meat Group announced they had formed a joint venture with Teys Australia. In 2011, Cargill bought out CMG's share in the company.

Due to drought, floods, general economic conditions and disputes with workers, both facilities have experienced a number of closures over the years including the closure of the Lakes Creek meatworks from 2002 until 2004, but they are both currently operating as normal.

The Central Queensland Livestock Exchange at Gracemere is one of the largest livestock sales facilities in the country, lies just to the west of the city.

Rockhampton promotes itself as the Beef Capital of Australia but the title has been disputed a number of times by the New South Wales town of Casino.

The tri-annual Beef Australia Expo held in the city is a celebration of the local area's cattle industry.

Military
There is a permanent military presence in Rockhampton with members of the Australian Defence Force based at the Western Street Army Barracks located near the Rockhampton Airport. To the north of the city lies the extensive Shoalwater Bay Military Training Area where large scale ground, air and amphibious operations are regularly conducted.

Due to its close proximity to the training area, the city regularly sees military movements between the Western Street Army Barracks and Shoalwater Bay, and hosts service personnel from overseas when joint military exercises are held. When these exercises occur, Rockhampton sees a noticeable increase in activity from military transport, including from defence aircraft that are frequently seen at Rockhampton Airport throughout the exercise periods.

The local economy is significantly boosted when visiting overseas troops stay in the city while participating in the army exercises.

Military training conducted in the Rockhampton area regularly draws the ire of nomadic peace activists who travel to the city to protest the exercises.

In 2011, during Exercise Talisman Sabre, a protester made his way onto the tarmac at Rockhampton Airport and attacked a $36 million Tiger helicopter with a garden mattock. The man was ordered to stand trial charged with wilful damage and threatening an aircraft but died before the matter went to trial.

Tourism
Tourism is increasingly playing a role in the economic development of city and surrounds. The city is a convenient distance north from Brisbane to provide an overnight stop for tourists, who can then branch out to visit local attractions and spend money at local businesses including eateries, entertainment facilities or on recreational activities. The Capricorn Coast is a 30-minute drive from Rockhampton, with the islands of the Keppel group easily accessible from there.

Other attractions that are promoted to the tourist market include the Fitzroy River, the Heritage-listed buildings in the CBD, the Rockhampton Heritage Village, the Dreamtime Cultural Centre, the Archer Park Rail Museum, Mount Archer National Park, Rockhampton Botanic Gardens, and Rockhampton Zoo.

A national promotional campaign was launched in 2013 to promote the local area as a premium tourist destination, featuring local singer-songwriter Kate Leahy whose song "We Like" featured as the soundtrack to the television commercials that showed the attractions of Rockhampton and the Capricorn Coast.

Other industry
Other industries in the Rockhampton area include the transport, manufacturing, mining and energy sectors.
 
Rail group Aurizon (previously known as QR National) has a large workforce in the city, which is the meeting point for the main north coast rail line and the line to the major coalfields to the west. However, the company announced in October 2015 that it was closing its locomotive and maintenance depots in Rockhampton with forty jobs lost from the Rockhampton site. Management of Aurizon's Rockhampton site was criticised by the Australian Manufacturing Workers Union in 2016 who described it as "appalling", prompting 60 workers to walk off the job citing lack of consultation, lack of adequate training for apprentices, a lack of privacy and unfair demands from management for workers to increase productivity.

The coal fired 1445 megawatt Stanwell Power Station lies at Stanwell, 30 kilometers west of the city, where Stanwell Corporation provides jobs for people living in Rockhampton. The power station currently has a workforce of about 150 employees and regularly hires new apprentices from Rockhampton

Sibelco operates magnesia mine at Kunwarara and processing plant at Parkhurst which employs many locals, although the company announced in 2015 that it would axe 57 jobs from its local operations, with another 45 jobs axed in 2016.

Culture 
Many local concerts, performances, events, festivals are held at the Rockhampton's numerous venues throughout the city each year.

The annual Rockhampton Cultural Festival held each August at the Rockhampton Heritage Village features a variety of market stalls, displays, international foods, music and cultural displays.

The Rockhampton Showgrounds plays host to numerous events each year. Most notably, the three-day Rockhampton Show is held in June each year.

Like many Australian communities, Rockhampton commemorates Anzac Day on 25 April each year. Rockhampton is believed to be the very first city in Australia to hold an early morning commemoration intentionally scheduled to coincide with when the landing at Gallipoli took place, as the city held a "daybreak" service at 6:30 am on 25 April 1916, in which 700 people attended.

In 1893, Alfred Henry Lambton wrote what is recognised as the first crime novel set in Queensland, From Prison to Power.  The novel takes place at the fictitious cattle station, 'Banalba', located 200 miles inland from the important tropical Queensland town of 'Rockington' [Rockhampton].

Pilbeam Theatre opened in 1979 and is Rockhampton's largest theatre.

The Rockhampton Art Gallery collection, also owned by the Rockhampton Regional Council, is situated next to the Pilbeam Theatre and consists mainly of works by Australian artists from the 1940s to the 1970s.

Opened in 1985, closed in 2011 and then re-opened in 2015 the Rockhampton Music Bowl regularly plays host to events including the annual Carols by Candlelight every December.

The tri-annual Beef Australia Exposition is held every third May at the Rockhampton Showgrounds. In 2009 as part of the Q150 celebrations, the Beef Australia Expo was announced as one of the Q150 Icons of Queensland for its role as an "event and festival".

Rockhampton has played quite an important role in the production and exhibition of films in Central Queensland.

Films shot in Rockhampton include The Kid Stakes, Buddies, and Broke.

Sport 
 Australian rules football – Brothers Roos, Glenmore Bulls, Rockhampton Panthers (AFL Capricornia)
 Basketball – Rockhampton Rockets (men's); Rockhampton Cyclones (women's)
 Cricket – Senior – Frenchville Falcons, North's Tigers, Gracemere Bulls, Rocky United, Capricorn Coast, Brothers, Colts Junior – Frenchville Falcons, North's Tigers, Gracemere Bulls, Capricorn Coast, Brothers, Grammar
 Football (Soccer) – Capricorn Cougars and Central Queensland
 Mountain Biking – Rockhampton Mountain Bike Club – "Rocky MTB" '. With three trail networks around the city, Rocky MTB is based at First Turkey MTB Reserve at Norman Gardens adjacent to Mount Archer National Park. The club is a member of Mountain Bike Australia (MTBA) and hosts regional, state and national events. Team members compete throughout Australia at major races.
 Roller Derby – Rocky Roller Derby – "Beef City Brawlers" Rugby League – Central Comets in the Queensland Cup, Central Queensland Capras (representative), Central Queensland University – Norths Chargers, Fitzroy – Gracemere Sharks, Rockhampton Brothers in the Rockhampton & District Rugby League (A Grade)
 Rugby Union – Rockhampton Brahmans, Brothers Old Boys
 Touch Football – Rockhampton Redbacks Attractions 
Established in 1869, the Rockhampton Botanic Gardens are located on Spencer Street in South Rockhampton. Excellent specimens of palms, cycads and ferns are found throughout the manicured grounds. Some specimens are over 100 years old. 

Michel Moulds is a former professional bookmaker at calligan Park racing course and is the main celebrity.

Rockhampton Zoo is located between the Botanic Gardens and Murray Lagoon. Animals and birds include koalas, chimpanzees, saltwater crocodiles, freshwater crocodiles, red kangaroos and the rare cassowary.

A second public garden, the Kershaw Gardens, was officially opened in 1988 on the site of the former Rockhampton rubbish dump. Located on the Bruce Highway in North Rockhampton, these gardens specialise in Australian native plants, especially those of Central Queensland. The most striking feature of the gardens is the imitation waterfall constructed on the northern boundary of the site (adjacent to the highway), which aims to recreate a scene from the Blackdown Tableland.
The Dreamtime Cultural Centre is Australia's largest Cultural Centre and is set on more than 12 hectares of land, with native plants, trees and waterfalls. The major points of interest at the Dreamtime Cultural Centre include the Torres Strait Islander village, didgeridoo playing, Djarn Djarn dancers, and throwing the returning boomerang. Black flying foxes and occasionally Grey-headed flying foxes can be seen and heard at night and are important native pollinators and seed dispersers of over 100 species of trees.

The Archer Park Steam Tram Museum covers the development and history of rail-based transportation in the major central Queensland town of Rockhampton and is set in the 100-year-old Archer Park rail station on Denison Street on the city's southside. The museum tells the story of Archer Park Station (built in 1899) and the unique Purrey Steam Tram, through photographs, soundscapes and object-based exhibitions.

 Rising out of Rockhampton's north-eastern suburbs, Mount Archer National Park provides views of the city, and showcases a range of native Australian flora and fauna. Frazer Park, at the summit of Mount Archer, is approximately 604 metres above sea level.

A short drive north of Rockhampton is the Capricorn Caves.

 Health 
The smaller Hillcrest and Mater private hospitals are located nearby. The Australian Red Cross Blood Service is located at the rear of the Base Hospital on Quarry Street.

Rockhampton is a base for the Royal Flying Doctor Service and the Capricorn Helicopter Rescue Service which operates clinics and provides emergency evacuations in remote communities throughout the region.

 Facilities 
The Rockhampton Regional Council operates the Rockhampton Regional Library Administration and History Centre in Rockhampton on the corner of William & Alma Streets. Branch libraries are located in Berserker ("Rockhampton North"), Gracemere, Mount Morgan and West Rockhampton ("Anytime" at Rockhampton Airport).

 Education 

The first school, The Rockhampton National School was opened in 1859. Rockhampton is a major education centre for the region and has numerous state and private primary and high schools.

CQUniversity Australia was founded in Rockhampton in 1967, however the university now has more than 30,000 students spread across 24 campuses and locations Australia-wide. The university has a focus on engagement, social innovation and engaged research, as well inclusivity and has a history as a leading provider of distance education.

The university was recognised within the top 600 universities in the world by the Times Higher Education World University Rankings, and was named among the top 150 universities, under 50, by the Times Higher Education World University Rankings in 2016.

The university currently delivers more than 300 education and training offerings, from short courses and certificates, through to undergraduate, postgraduate and research degrees.

Secondary schools in Rockhampton include Rockhampton State High School, North Rockhampton State High School, Rockhampton Grammar School, Rockhampton Girls Grammar School, The Cathedral College, Rockhampton, Emmaus College and Heights College.

 Media 

 Newspapers 
Rockhampton has had a number of newspapers published in the city since European settlement.The Morning Bulletin is the only surviving daily newspaper, first published in 1861 as the Rockhampton Bulletin and Central Queensland Advertiser.  The title was changed to the Rockhampton Bulletin in 1871 before finally becoming The Morning Bulletin in 1878.  The Morning Bulletin is a member of the Australian Regional Media network of newspapers, now owned by News Corporation.  The Morning Bulletin has also previously complimented their main daily newspaper with a free home-delivered community newspaper, with previous incarnations including titles such as the Capricorn Local News, Rockhampton and Fitzroy News and The Rocky Mirror.

In 2012, a new Rockhampton newspaper called The Queensland Telegraph was launched by Queensland Media Holdings. However, after publishing the newspaper for about a year, the newspaper's management announced on 17 July 2013 that the local newspaper office had closed.The Central Queensland Herald was a Rockhampton newspaper which was published from 1930 until 1956.  The Capricornian was a Rockhampton newspaper which was published from 1875 until 1929.  In 1929, The Capricornian merged with The Artesian to become The Central Queensland Herald.  The Artesian was a Rockhampton newspaper which was published from 1919 until 1929.  In 1929, The Artesian merged with The Capricornian to become The Central Queensland Herald.  The Evening News was a Rockhampton newspaper published from 1922 until 1941.  The Daily Northern Argus (originally The Northern Argus) was a Rockhampton newspaper published from 1863 until 1896.  In 1897 the newspaper merged with The Record and was published as The Daily Record until 1922.

Established in 2006, industrial magazine publication Shift Miner is also produced in Rockhampton with its head office located in the Rockhampton CBD.Contact Information , Shift Miner website

 Radio 
Rockhampton is serviced by a number of commercial, community and ABC stations

4RO is Rockhampton's local AM station, owned by Grant Broadcasters. 4RO broadcasts local breakfast and morning programs from its local studios each weekday with all other programming sourced from elsewhere. The music played on 4RO is of the classic hits genre. 4RO broadcasts a local news service in the morning, although the bulletins are prepared and read by journalists based at Grant's Sunshine Coast hub, especially for 4RO and its sister station, 4CC.

4CC also owned by Grant Broadcasters, is an AM commercial station servicing Rockhampton on a local AM frequency, although its local breakfast show is presented from a studio in Gladstone. 4CC has a classic hits format and also relies heavily on programming sourced from elsewhere.

Triple M Central Queensland is Rockhampton's local commercial FM station owned by Southern Cross Austereo.  The station was previously branded as Sea FM. Triple M broadcasts local programs from its Rockhampton studios each weekday morning, before taking networked programming sourced from Gold FM on the Gold Coast and other Triple M stations. Triple M in Rockhampton also produces a local news service with a journalist based at the station, compiling and recording local news bulletins for Triple M and sister station Hit Central Queensland.  As part of the Triple M network, the station also broadcasts sports coverage such as Triple M Rocks NRL and Triple M Rocks Test Cricket.

Hit Central Queensland, also owned by Southern Cross Austereo, is a commercial FM station servicing Rockhampton on a local FM frequency, although its local breakfast show is broadcast from a studio in Gladstone. The station was previously branded as Hot FM and is skewed towards the younger listeners with a Top 40/pop music format. Following the local breakfast show, the station takes generic Hit Network programming sourced from Southern Cross Austereo's hub at Sea FM on the Gold Coast or nationally networked programs from metropoliton Hit Network stations such as 2Day FM or Fox FM.

ABC Capricornia, originally known as 4RK, is the local ABC station in Rockhampton, servicing the entire Central Queensland region. It broadcasts a local breakfast show and a local morning show each weekday. Friday's local morning show is also broadcast to other stations on the ABC Local Radio network enabling listeners from outside of the local listening area to call into the popular gardening talk back program. ABC Capricornia also has a local news service, produced by local journalists. The station also airs a local Saturday breakfast show, which is followed by a local Saturday morning sports program. Apart from local programming, ABC Capricornia takes national programs like AM, Conversations, The World Today, PM, Nightlife, Grandstand, Saturday Night Country and Australia All Over along with a mid-afternoon program, a drive program, an evening show and a weekend morning program syndicated from Brisbane.  Other national ABC services that are available in Rockhampton on separate FM frequencies include Triple J, RN, ABC Classic FM and ABC NewsRadio.

4YOU is the local community station, broadcasting local programs from their Rockhampton studio, presented by a number of volunteers. The station is skewed towards the older demographic and plays a lot of easy listening and country music. All programs are locally produced apart from the regular Sunday evening programs the station takes from the national community radio network.

4US is the local indigenous community station, broadcasting from a studio at the Dreamtime Cultural Centre in Rockhampton servicing the local Aboriginal and Torres Strait Islander population featuring traditional music and focusing on indigenous issues and event within its programming content.

KIX Country is a national narrowcast FM broadcasting service provided by Grant Broadcasters, available in Rockhampton.  Kix solely broadcasts country music-themed programming, which includes programs which originate from studios in Bundaberg complemented by some nationally syndicated programming. While Kix transmits on a narrowcast licence, the station is allowed to broadcast commercials.

Other narrowcast radio services available in Rockhampton include racing station, Radio TAB (formerly 4TAB), Vision Radio Network and Radio FM 88 (Tourist Information).

 Television 
Rockhampton is served by three commercial stations and two public broadcasters.

 Seven Queensland
 Southern Cross 10
 WIN Television Queensland
 ABC TV
 SBS TV

Each broadcasts television services in digital formats.

SBS offers digital high-definition simulcasts of their main channel, SBS ONE on SBS HD. There are also ten other main channels available: ABC2, ABC3, ABC News 24, SBS Two, One, Eleven, 7Two, 7mate, 9Gem and 9Go!. Austar Limited provides subscription satellite television services.

All three main commercial networks produce local news coverage - Seven Queensland and WIN Television both air 30-minute local news bulletins at 6pm each weeknight, produced from newsrooms in the city but broadcast from studios in Maroochydore and Wollongong respectively. Southern Cross 10 airs local news updates during the day from its studios in Hobart. It previously aired a regional Queensland edition of Nine News from Brisbane each weeknight at 6pm, featuring local opt-outs for Rockhampton and Central Queensland when it was a Nine affiliate.

There is also a small television facility at the ABC studios in Rockhampton with a journalist and camera operator employed locally to produce stories for ABC News and programs such as 7.30 and Landline''. The journalist can also be required to do live crosses for ABC News 24.  The ABC had also previously produced a nightly local TV news bulletin for Rockhampton and Central Queensland but it was axed in 1985.

Infrastructure

Transport 

Rockhampton is an important transport hub in the Central Queensland region. Rockhampton provides important transport links between the Central Highlands and Capricorn Coast regions and the areas to the north and south of the state. Rockhampton Airport is essential to the viability of the tourism industry.

The Rockhampton region is well serviced by the national and state highway systems, with the city being located at the main junction of the coastal highway, the Bruce Highway, the central western highway, the Capricorn Highway, and the Rockhampton Hinterland is serviced by the Burnett Highway. Driving time is seven and a half hours from Brisbane to Rockhampton.

Rockhampton is also served by long-distance coaches to Brisbane in the south, and as far as Cairns in the north. Daily services operate into Rockhampton with Greyhound Australia. The Hinterland and Central Highlands are also serviced daily by Rothery's Coaches, Pacific Coaches and Emerald Coaches.

Bus services are operated by Sunbus Rockhampton, which operates under the QConnect public transport system. Two bus interchanges are located in Rockhampton City through which the majority of services operate. Service include most parts of the city, Parkhurst in the north to Allenstown and Depot Hill in the south and to The Range and Lakes Creek in the west

Rockhampton has one major taxi company, Yellow Cabs, who service the City of Rockhampton, Gracemere, and also some services in Yeppoon and Emu Park.

Rockhampton railway station is located on the North Coast railway, and is the terminus of the electrified section of line from Brisbane with through diesel service continuing beyond; services are provided by Queensland Rail. Denison St, Rockhampton is one of the few places where the main line runs down the middle of the street. An Electric Tilt Train services connects it to Brisbane, and the Diesel Tilt Train services the station en route to Cairns.

Rockhampton Airport is operated by Rockhampton Regional Council and is located  (3.7 mi) west of Rockhampton City. It is Australia's twelfth busiest domestic airport. The airport handles flights to major Australian cities, tourist destinations, and regional destinations throughout Central Queensland. It is an important base for general aviation serving the Central Highlands and Capricorn Coast communities. The airport is also a base for the Royal Flying Doctor Service and the Rescue Helicopter.

Road train access to Rockhampton
The project for upgrading between Gracemere saleyards and the Rockhampton abattoirs to provide access for Type 1 Road Trains was completed by early 2021 at a total cost of $30 million.
 Capricorn Highway - from Saleyards Road at Gracemere to the Bruce Highway roundabout at Rochhampton.
 Bruce Highway - from the Capricorn Highway roundabout to the Yaamba Road intersection.
 Rockhampton-Yeppoon Road - from the Bruce Highway intersection south-west to the Emu Park Road intersection (.

Water 
The catchment area of the Fitzroy River is approximately 145,000 square kilometres (almost the size of England).
It contains six major rivers, and Rockhampton and Central Queensland accordingly enjoy abundant good water. The existing and future dams under construction ensure on-going needs for agriculture, industry and domestic purposes are met.
The Fitzroy River Barrage at Rockhampton separates tidal salt water from upstream fresh water, and provides the supply for Rockhampton's domestic and industrial needs.

Power 
Central Queensland's major generating facilities, including the Stanwell, Gladstone and Callide power stations, produce the majority of the State's power. The Stanwell facility is a key element in the State's program to expand electricity supply and is a major exporter of power station technology.

Sister city 
  Ibusuki, Japan (since 20 November 1980)

See also 
 List of people from Rockhampton
 Capricorn Coast

References

Further reading 
 McDonald L. (1981) Rockhampton: A History of City and District. University of Queensland Press, St Lucia, Qld. 
 Bird JTS. (1904) The Early History of Rockhampton. The Morning Bulletin, Rockhampton, Qld.

External links 

 
 
 

 
1858 establishments in Australia
Populated places established in 1858
Port cities in Queensland
Rockhampton Region